An advance reading copy, advance review copy, advance reader's edition, advance copy, or a reader's edition (ARC or ARE) is a free copy of a new book given by a publisher to booksellers, librarians, journalists, celebrities, or others, or as a contest or school prize, before the book is printed for mass distribution.

Overview
ARCs may lack the final dust jacket, formatting, and binding of the finished product. The text of an advance edition may also differ slightly from the market book (the final version that is distributed for sale), because changes may be made after advance readers make comments or find errors in the manuscript. When a celebrity reader or journalist gives an endorsement, that may be added to the dust-cover and other promotional items.

ARCs are normally distributed three to six months before the book is officially released to the general public.

Book collectors often seek ARCs, which may contain text errors or typos that add value, as coins or stamps with errors do.

On rare occasions (for instance, on the publication of an eagerly awaited or controversial book), a publisher may require the recipients of an ARC to sign a confidentiality of content agreement. However, in most cases the sheer number of ARCs produced and distributed makes that impractical. A typical genre publisher will produce 5,000 ARCs for a new book by a moderately popular writer.

Before it was a common practice to produce and distribute ARCs in this way, publishers used uncorrected, bound galley proofs only for the editing and proof-reading process. Typically, they were bound in plain paper covers without illustrations, printed in black and white, and significantly larger than their market book counterparts. In contrast, ARCs usually are printed in full color, and have bindings, format, and illustrations that are similar to those of the market book. The phrase 'uncorrected proof' appears on the ARC cover.

Although ARCs are usually free promotional items, some early versions of books, even some labeled by the publisher as ARCs, are sold to the public. An example is Captain Vorpatril's Alliance by Lois McMaster Bujold.

Digital advance copies

Publishers who produce galley proofs in electronic form rather than as a physical book do not use them as ARCs. However, with the rise of ebooks and ereaders, it is now common for ARCs (in contrast to galley proofs) to be distributed as eBooks on websites such as NetGalley. Both traditionally published and self-published ARCs may be available for distribution on such sites. Recently, eARC has come into common use for advance copies of eBooks. This usage dates back to at least 2010 and was promoted by Baen Books for their trade eBooks from at least June, 2005 onward.

References

Books by type
Book terminology